Hills Beach is seaside community in Biddeford, York County, Maine, approximately  north of Boston, Massachusetts.

Hills Beach is a narrow stretch of sandy beach on the north side of Biddeford Pool near the mouth of the Saco River and near the Saco Bay. The beach is protected by a breakwater on the north side and the curve of the cove to the south. Access to Hills Beach is at the entrance to the University of New England. Hills Beach is located near Basket Island, Wood Island Light, Stage Island, and others.

See also
List of beaches in New England
List of islands of Maine
Fortunes Rocks, Maine

External links
The islands surrounding Hills Beach

References

Neighborhoods in Maine
Portland metropolitan area, Maine
Biddeford, Maine
Beaches of Maine